Ingram is a former settlement in Coahoma and Quitman counties, Mississippi, United States. Ingram was located near the Coldwater River north of Birdie.

References

Former populated places in Coahoma County, Mississippi
Former populated places in Quitman County, Mississippi
Former populated places in Mississippi